Peter Fontaine (1691–1757) was a clergyman at Westover Church, Westover Parish, Charles City County, Virginia.

Family 
His parents, of noble French Huguenot extraction, were forced to leave for England, later Great Britain, and then Ireland after the revocation of the Edict of Nantes with the Edict of Fontainebleau in October 1685. His father Jacques de la Fontaine (later James Fontaine) was also a Reverend, while his mother was Anne Elizabeth Boursiquot. He had three older siblings.

His daughter Magdalen (who was ten-years-old) was raped and murder by Roman Catholic soldiers, by orders of the clergy to not suffer anyone of the Protestant faith alone in all of the Piedmontese valleys.

Quote 
Dear brother, feed much on soup and vegetables, and good fruits; and in the winter good salad oil with endive, dandelion, and other bitter salads at your meals, will help digestion, cut the tough phlegm which engenders the pleurisy, make good blood, and keep the body in good order. I know you eat little meat. Taking the air on horseback in fine weather, and your employment in your garden, will keep you healthy and cheerful, with God's blessing. Be pleased with little things, such as the flourishing of a tree or a plant, or a bed of flowers, and fret not at disappointments. Why may not the growth of your trees afford you as much pleasure as the flourishing of a colony does to His Majesty, who hath as many, God bless him! as you have trees. Excuse this piece of quackery. I give you the same advice I follow myself, and am with great sincerity, dear brother,
Your affectionate, humble servant,
Peter Fontaine.
Peter Fontaine to his brother Moses, 14 Feb. 1750–1, in Memoirs of a Huguenot Family, p. 358.

External links 
 Memoirs of a Huguenot Family (1853) at Wikisource
 The Fontaine Family - A Brief History

1691 births
1759 deaths
People from Charles City County, Virginia
People from Taunton